Harry J. Fishbein (April 18, 1897 – February 19, 1976) was an American bridge player and club owner. He used to be a professional basketball player. In  competition, Fishbein was a runner-up for the world championship in the 1959 Bermuda Bowl, playing on the United States team in a three-way round-robin among Europe, North America, and South America representatives. Fishbein was "the presiding genius" of the famous Mayfair club [or Mayfair Bridge Club] for more than 20 years" – proprietor of the training ground of experts from 1943 to 1966. As of 1960 he was also ACBL Treasurer.

He developed the Fishbein convention as a defense against preemptive opening bids.

Biography
He was born on April 18, 1898, in Manhattan, New York City. He died on February 19, 1976, at the New York Infirmary following a heart attack.

Legacy
Fishbein was inducted into the ACBL Hall of Fame in 2000.

He was a second cousin of the noted Orthodox Jewish scholar J.D. Eisenstein.

Publications

Bridge accomplishments

Honors
 ACBL Hall of Fame, 2000

Wins
 North American Bridge Championships (16)
 Master Individual (2) 1942, 1952 
 von Zedtwitz Life Master Pairs (2) 1939, 1940 
 Wernher Open Pairs (1) 1959 
 Hilliard Mixed Pairs (3) 1937, 1942, 1946 
 Vanderbilt (5) 1936, 1943, 1947, 1949, 1958 
 Marcus Cup (1) 1967 
 Mitchell Board-a-Match Teams (1) 1965 
 Chicago Mixed Board-a-Match (1) 1947

Runners-up

 Bermuda Bowl (1) 1959
 North American Bridge Championships
 Master Individual (1) 1938 
 Silodor Open Pairs (2) 1959, 1968 
 Wernher Open Pairs (1) 1940 
 Nail Life Master Open Pairs (1) 1963 
 Open Pairs (1928-1962) (5) 1934, 1937, 1940, 1941, 1942 
 Masters Team of 4 (1) 1937 
 Mitchell Board-a-Match Teams (3) 1952, 1953, 1960 
 Chicago Mixed Board-a-Match (2) 1945, 1948 
 Reisinger (4) 1942, 1953, 1957, 1959 
 Spingold (3) 1943, 1945, 1958

References

External links
 
 

1896 births
1976 deaths
American contract bridge players
Bermuda Bowl players
Contract bridge writers
Jewish American writers
Writers from New York City
20th-century American Jews